Ghostwriter is a children's mystery television series created by Liz Nealon and produced by Children's Television Workshop and BBC Television. It began airing on PBS on October 4, 1992, and the last episode aired on February 12, 1995. The series revolves around a multiethnic group of friends from Brooklyn who solve neighborhood crimes and mysteries as a team of youth detectives with the help of a ghost named Ghostwriter. Ghostwriter can communicate with children only by manipulating whatever text and letters he can find and using them to form words and sentences. The series was filmed on location in Fort Greene, Brooklyn.

Overview
The series is designed to teach reading and writing skills to schoolchildren. Each mystery is presented as a case, covering four 30-minute episodes (except for the first and fifth story arc, where there are five 30 minute episodes); children are encouraged to follow each mystery and use the reading and writing clues given to attempt to solve them just as the Ghostwriter team does.

Episodes

Cast

 Sheldon Turnipseed as Jamal Jenkins
 Blaze Berdahl as Lenni Frazier
 David López as Alex Fernández
 Mayteana Morales as Gaby Fernández (1992–1994)
 Tram-Anh Tran as Tina Nguyen
 Todd Alexander Cohen as Rob Baker (1992–1993)
 William Hernandez as Héctor Carrero (1993–1995)
 Melissa González as Gaby Fernández (1994–1995)
 Lateaka Vinson as Casey Austin (1994–1995)
 Marcella Lowery as CeCe Jenkins

Critics and merchandise
Ghostwriter was critically acclaimed and honored for presenting a realistic, ethnically diverse world in its two-hour mystery stories. By the end of its third season, Ghostwriter ranked in the top five of all children's shows on American television.

Created as an integrated, branded, multi-media project, the Ghostwriter brand included magazines and teacher's guides, software (Microsoft), home video, games/licensed product, and other outreach materials that reached over a million children each month. There were many Ghostwriter novels released, both novelizations of the TV episodes and new stories. They were released by Bantam Books.

Noggin's website featured exclusive casebook files based on the show.

Broadcast and home release
Ghostwriter has been broadcast in 24 countries worldwide, and generated a number of foreign-language adaptations, including a dubbed over version on Discovery Kids in Latin America marketed as Fantasma Escritor.

Despite its popularity, the program was abruptly canceled after the third season due to inadequate funding after the BBC pulled out of co-producing the show. The original series was rerun from 1995 to 1999 on PBS. From 1999 to 2003, it aired on the Noggin cable network, which was jointly founded by the Children's Television Workshop (now known as Sesame Workshop) with Paramount's Nickelodeon. The show's revival The New Ghostwriter Mysteries also aired on Noggin as part of its nighttime programming blocks, The Hubbub and The N.

VHS releases
During the mid-1990s, Ghostwriter was released on VHS by Republic Pictures Home Video. The company released "Ghost Story", "Who Burned Mr. Brinker's Store?", and "Into the Comics" with their respective story-arc episodes edited together into a feature-length format.

DVD releases

In February 2010, it was announced that Season 1 of Ghostwriter would be released on DVD by Shout! Factory. The 5-disc set, running 870 minutes long, was released on June 8, 2010. Supplements are a trivia game and a casebook. The entire series except for the last two story arcs were also released by GPN.

Awards and nominations
 Writers Guild of America, United States, 1995
 Won, WGA Award (TV) for Children's Script—Carin Greenberg Baker, for "Don't Stop The Music".
 Young Artist Awards, 1993
 Nominated, Outstanding Performers in a Children's Program: Todd Alexander, Blaze Berdahl, David López, Mayteana Morales, Tram-Anh Tran, Sheldon Turnipseed

The New Ghostwriter Mysteries
In 1997, CBS aired a new version of the series, The New Ghostwriter Mysteries, as part of their educational Think CBS Kids block, but it was canceled after one season due to low ratings. The new series had little in common with the original, changing Ghostwriter's on-screen appearance, introducing entirely new characters, and getting rid of the serial format of the original series. The series was filmed in Toronto, Ontario, Canada, and featured a new team of three kids: Camella Gorik (Charlotte Sullivan), Emilie Robeson (Erica Luttrell), and Henry "Strick" Strickland (Kristian Ayre). Ghostwriter only had two colors, which were silver and gold.

Ghostwriter's identity
Ghostwriter producer and writer Kermit Frazier revealed in a 2010 interview that Ghostwriter was a runaway slave during the American Civil War. He taught other slaves how to read and write and was killed by slave catchers and their dogs. His spirit was kept in the book that Jamal discovers and opens in the pilot episode, freeing the ghost.

Radio series
In Summer 2006, BBC School Radio produced a radio series of Ghostwriter for primary school students. Character names from the TV series were retained, though voiced by new children. Music and the theme song were also kept, and a new arranged jingle for children to recognize Ghostwriter's appearances was created by Sesame Workshop.

Revival

In September 2019, it was reported that a Ghostwriter revival would air on Apple TV+. The series premiered on November 1, 2019. The series was nominated for eight Daytime Emmy Awards.

A spin-off, Ghostwriter: Beyond the Page, premiered on April 1, 2021.

References

External links
 
 
 
 
 BBC School Radio: Ghostwriter
 Announcement at TV Shows on DVD website – Ghostwriter: Season 1 on DVD
 Analysis in The Atlantic

 
1990s American children's television series
1990s American mystery television series
1990s American school television series
1992 American television series debuts
1995 American television series endings
1997 American television series debuts
1997 American television series endings
1990s British children's television series
1990s British mystery television series
1992 British television series debuts
1995 British television series endings
American children's education television series
American children's fantasy television series
American children's mystery television series
American time travel television series
BBC children's television shows
British children's education television series
British children's fantasy television series
British children's mystery television series
British time travel television series
Brooklyn in fiction
CBS original programming
English-language education television programming
Middle school television series
PBS Kids shows
Reading and literacy television series
Television series about children
Television series about ghosts
Television series by Sesame Workshop
Television shows filmed in New York (state)
Television shows set in New York City